Boa orophias, the San Lucia boa, is a species of snake in the family Boidae. The species is endemic to Saint Lucia. Boa orophias was described as a full species by Carl Linnaeus in 1758, but many later authors have classified it as a subspecies of Boa constrictor. According to the IUCN Red List, Boa orophias is a species, which they have listed as Endangered.

References 

orophias
Reptiles of Saint Lucia
Reptiles described in 1758
Taxa named by Carl Linnaeus